Swanee Shore: (a dreamy Southern waltz song) is a song composed by Sidney D. Mitchell, Arthur Fields and Irving Kaufman in 1919 and published by Leo Feist Inc.

References 

Bibliography
Jasen, David A. Tin Pan Alley: The Composers, the Songs, the Performers, and Their Times : the Golden Age of American Popular Music from 1886 to 1956. New York: D.I. Fine, 1988. . 
Paas, John Roger. America Sings of War: American Sheet Music from World War I. Wiesbaden: Harrassowitz Vertag, 2014.  
Parker, Bernard S. World War I Sheet Music: 9,670 Patriotic Songs Published in the United States, 1914-1920, with More Than 600 Covers Illustrated. Jefferson, N.C.: McFarland, 2007.  

Songs about rivers
1919 songs
Songs of World War I
Songs with lyrics by Sidney D. Mitchell
Songs with lyrics by Arthur Fields